The Diocese of Allentown is a Latin Church ecclesiastical jurisdiction or diocese of the Catholic Church, located in Allentown, Pennsylvania in the Lehigh Valley region of eastern Pennsylvania. The Diocese of Allentown is a suffragan diocese in the ecclesiastical province of the metropolitan Archdiocese of Philadelphia in the Eastern United States.

Its cathedral is the Cathedral Church of Saint Catharine of Siena, located in Allentown. It was announced on December 9, 2016 that Pope Francis had transferred Allentown Bishop John O. Barres to the Diocese of Rockville Centre in Long Island, New York.

As the fifth bishop of Allentown, Pope Francis, on June 27, 2017 appointed Monsignor Alfred A. Schlert. Bishop Schlert is the first priest ordained for the Diocese of Allentown to be appointed bishop of the diocese. He was ordained a bishop and installed as Bishop of Allentown on August 31, 2017.

Catholics form the largest single religious group in the five counties of the diocese. In the 80 parishes of the diocese, there are more than 252,000 registered Catholics, representing more than 20 percent of the general population.

Statistics

The diocese covers the Pennsylvania counties of Berks, Carbon, Lehigh, Northampton and Schuylkill. It has a Catholic population of 258,997 as of 2015, approximately 20.4% of the total population; it maintains 80 parishes, 30 Catholic elementary schools, and 7 Catholic high schools.

History 
The diocese was founded on January 28, 1961 by Pope John XXIII splitting it from the Archdiocese of Philadelphia; the first bishop, Joseph Mark McShea, was installed on April 11 of that year. During his 22-year tenure, he oversaw the construction, purchase, and renovation of over 300 church buildings. In 1964, McShea, together with the Oblates of St. Francis de Sales, founded Allentown College (currently known as DeSales University). He convened the first diocesan synod in May 1968.

McShea founded "Operation Rice Bowl" which began in the form of a small cardboard box in the parishes of the diocese to receive alms directed to relieving a famine in Africa. In 1976 it was adopted by the United States Conference of Catholic Bishops as a national program, and the following year assigned to Catholic Relief Services. He helmed the founding of Holy Family Manor, a nursing and rehabilitation center at the former Eugene Grace mansion in Bethlehem, Pennsylvania. He also established Holy Family Villa, a retirement home for priests.

Bishop McShea was followed by Bishop Thomas Welsh, formerly Bishop of the Diocese of Arlington, Virginia. Welsh established the first Youth Ministry Office in the diocese and raised $13 million in an endowment campaign for diocesan schools and other educational efforts. He was a member of the Board of Trustees and Executive Committee of the National Shrine of the Immaculate Conception in Washington, D.C. Walsh gained recognition for his work to improve relations between Catholics and Jews. He established a diocesan newspaper, the AD Times and founded the Catholic Distance University.

Bishop Edward Cullen was the third bishop of the Diocese of Allentown. In 2008, Cullen, under the direction of the metropolitan archbishop, Cardinal Anthony Bevilacqua, carried out a program to restructure many of the parishes in the diocese. As part of this program, 47 parishes were closed; this reduced the number of parishes from 151 to 104. Some of the closed churches were then sold.

John Barres was bishop for seven years before being appointed to the Diocese of Rockville Centre. During his tenure, Bishop Barres established the Saint Thomas More Society for lawyers, and expanded the diocese's Hispanic ministry and evangelization. He was succeeded by the archdiocese vicar general, Alfred Andrew Schlert.

Bishops

Bishops of Allentown 
 Joseph Mark McShea (1961–1983)
 Thomas Jerome Welsh (1983–1997)
 Edward Peter Cullen (1997–2009)
 John Oliver Barres (2009–2016), appointed Bishop of Rockville Centre
 Alfred A. Schlert (2017–present)

Other priests of this diocese who became bishops 
 Ronald William Gainer, appointed Bishop of Lexington in 2002 and later Bishop of Harrisburg
 Joseph Edward Kurtz, appointed Bishop of Knoxville in 1999 and later Archbishop of Louisville
 David B. Thompson, appointed  Coadjutor Bishop of Charleston in 1989 and later Bishop of Charleston

Reports of sexual abuse 

In early 2016, a grand jury investigation, led by Pennsylvania Attorney General Josh Shapiro, began an inquiry into sexual abuse by Catholic clergy in six Pennsylvania dioceses:  Allentown, Scranton, Harrisburg, Pittsburgh, Greensburg, and Erie. The Diocese of Altoona-Johnstown and the Archdiocese of Philadelphia were not included, as they had been the subjects of earlier investigations.

On August 1, 2018, Matt Kerr, spokesman for the Diocese of Allentown, announced that the diocese would cooperate with a Pennsylvania Supreme Court ruling and publish a list containing names of clergy suspected of taking part in sexual abuse of children. On August 14, 2018, a grand jury report named thirty-seven priests in the Allentown diocese accused of sexual misconduct. The allegations cover a period of several decades. Bishop Schlert issued an apology on behalf of the Allentown Diocese. Schlert stated that the cases of sexual abuse in the diocese date back decades and that most of the accused priests in the diocese are either deceased or no longer active in the ministry.
Schlert also stated that the diocese has had a zero tolerance policy for sexual abuse since 2003.

"Excerpts from the report depict Schlert as someone quick to confront priests who were the subject of abuse complaints. He, along with a fellow monsignor, helped facilitate several resignations and retirements from priests suspected of sexually abusing children. His inquiry with one accused priest triggered the process of that priest being laicized, or defrocked." Shapiro said that over time, Schlert was promoted for his role in handling the sex abuse allegations. Commenting on the grand jury report at the time of its release, Schlert noted that "much has changed in the past 15 years, notably, that the diocese immediately removes accused priests from ministry and reports allegations to law enforcement."

Three Allentown priests have been removed from ministry since the grand jury wrapped up its investigation, with one being reinstated when the allegation was determined to be unfounded. On August 22, 2018, Diocese priest Rev. Kevin Lonergan, who was not among those listed, was charged with indecent assault and corruption of minors after inappropriately touching a 17-year-old girl and sending nude images of himself to her. One accused priest was also revealed to have transferred to the Diocese of Orlando in Florida. In February 2020, Lonergan was sentenced to 1–2 years prison after being convicted.

Bishop Schlert suspended the priestly faculties of Father David C. Gillis pending the outcome of the investigation. Detectives in Berks County, Pennsylvania began investigating Gillis after the father of a girl reported she had been abused at a Catholic school where he used to work. The Berks County District Attorney's Office said, "As a result of our thorough investigation, it has been determined the allegation of child sexual abuse against Reverend Gillis was false. The alleged victim disclosed to our detectives, in an interview, that she was not sexually abused by Reverend Gillis." District Attorney John T. Adams said, "It is unfortunate that the accusation of child sexual abuse against Reverend Gillis was made public by the Diocese of Orlando before the outcome of this investigation could be determined."

On May 20, 2020, it was revealed that Timothy Paul McGettigan, a former parishioner of the St. Catharine of Siena in Reading who was now living in Texas, had filed a lawsuit against the Diocese of Allentown. In his court paperwork, which was filed in Lehigh County McGettigan stated that in the 1970s, he was sexually abused by two priests, Rev. Joseph Grembocki and Rev. David A. Soderlund, as well as several other priests whom he cannot identify. Grembocki died in 2016, while Soderlund was defrocked in 2005. Though Soderlund was named in the Pennsylvania grand jury report, Grembocki was not.

On August 14, 2020, it was revealed that the Diocese of Scranton, along with the Diocese of Allentown, as well as the Archdiocese of Philadelphia and fellow suffragan Dioceses in Pittsburgh and Scranton, was enduring the bulk of 150 new lawsuits filed against all eight Pennsylvania Catholic dioceses. On August 14, 2020, it was announced that the Diocese of Allentown now had 20 new sex abuse lawsuits.

Catholic education

Higher education
 DeSales University, Center Valley
 Alvernia University, Reading

High schools 
 Allentown Central Catholic High School
 Bethlehem Catholic High School
 Berks Catholic High School, Reading
 Marian Catholic High School, Tamaqua
 Nativity BVM High School, Pottsville
 Notre Dame High School, Easton

See also 

 Catholic Church by country
 Catholic Church in the United States
 Ecclesiastical Province of Philadelphia
 Global organisation of the Catholic Church
 List of Roman Catholic archdioceses (by country and continent)
 List of Roman Catholic dioceses (alphabetical) (including archdioceses)
 List of Roman Catholic dioceses (structured view) (including archdioceses)
 List of the Catholic dioceses of the United States

References

Sources and external links 
 Official website
 GCatholic, with Google map - data for most sections 

 
1961 establishments in Pennsylvania
Christian organizations established in 1961
Culture of Allentown, Pennsylvania
Allentown
Allentown